In mathematics, Mostow's rigidity theorem, or  strong rigidity theorem, or Mostow–Prasad rigidity theorem, essentially states that the geometry of a complete, finite-volume hyperbolic manifold of dimension greater than two is determined by the fundamental group and hence unique.

While the theorem shows that the deformation space of (complete) hyperbolic structures on a finite volume hyperbolic -manifold (for ) is a point, for a hyperbolic surface of genus  there is a moduli space of dimension  that parameterizes all metrics of constant curvature (up to diffeomorphism), a fact essential for Teichmüller theory. There is also a rich theory of deformation spaces of hyperbolic structures on infinite volume manifolds in three dimensions.

The theorem
The theorem can be given in a geometric formulation (pertaining to finite-volume, complete manifolds), and in an algebraic formulation (pertaining to lattices in Lie groups).

Geometric form

Let  be the -dimensional hyperbolic space. It is of finite volume if the integral of a volume form is finite (which is the case, for example, if it is compact). The Mostow rigidity theorem may be stated as:

Here  is the fundamental group of a manifold .

The proof actually shows that if  has greater dimension than  then there can be no homotopy equivalence between them.

Algebraic form
The group of isometries of hyperbolic space  can be identified with the Lie group  (the projective orthogonal group of a quadratic form of signature . Then the following statement is equivalent to the one above.

That is, there exists a  such that .

In greater generality 

Applications

Mostow rigidity was also used by Thurston to prove the uniqueness of circle packing representations of triangulated planar graphs.

A consequence of Mostow rigidity of interest in geometric group theory is that there exist hyperbolic groups which are quasi-isometric but not commensurable to each other.

See also 

 Superrigidity, a stronger result for higher-rank spaces
 Local rigidity, a result about deformations that are not necessarily lattices.

References

. (Provides a survey of a large variety of rigidity theorems, including those concerning Lie groups, algebraic groups and dynamics of flows. Includes 230 references.)
.  (Gives two proofs: one similar to Mostow's original proof, and another based on the Gromov norm)

Hyperbolic geometry
Differential geometry
Theorems in geometry